Pleiocarpine is an anticholinergic alkaloid.

External links

Tryptamine alkaloids
Indolizidines
Heterocyclic compounds with 6 rings